Styggebrekka Crevasses is a crevasse field near the center of Austreskorve Glacier, in the Muhlig-Hofmann Mountains of Queen Maud Land. Plotted from surveys and air photos by Norwegian Antarctic Expedition (1956–60) and named Styggebrekka (the dangerous slope).

Crevasse fields of Queen Maud Land
Princess Astrid Coast